
Gmina Gorzyce is a rural gmina (administrative district) in Tarnobrzeg County, Subcarpathian Voivodeship, in south-eastern Poland.

Villages
Gmina Gorzyce contains the villages and settlements of Furmany, Gorzyce, Motycze Poduchowne, Orliska, Sokolniki, Trześń, Wrzawy and Zalesie Gorzyckie.

Neighbouring gminas
Gmina Gorzyce is bordered by the towns of Sandomierz and Tarnobrzeg, and by the gminas of Dwikozy, Grębów, Radomyśl nad Sanem and Zaleszany.

References
 Polish official population figures 2006

Gorzyce
Gmina Gorzyce